EPFL is the École polytechnique fédérale de Lausanne, a research institute in Switzerland.

EPFL may also refer to:
Rolex Learning Center, also known as the "EPFL Learning Center", a campus and library in Switzerland
Presses polytechniques et universitaires romandes, a Swiss publishing house, the English imprint is known as EPFL Press
Eastern Pennsylvania Football League, an American football league that existed in 1938
European Leagues, an Association football organization previously known as the European Professional Football Leagues (EPFL)